Hot Lake is a lake in the U.S. state of Nevada.

Hot Lake was named for the fact hot springs empty into it.

References

Lakes of Humboldt County, Nevada